MALKA is an identity of the British singer-songwriter and lecturer, Tamara Schlesinger.

Life
Schlesinger began her career as the lead singer and songwriter of the British indie folk outfit, 6 Day Riot. Following three albums (with syndications on Skins and Scream 4) MALKA called time on the band and went on to co-write with Deadly Avenger the trailer music for Danny Boyle's 127 Hours. Their album The Procession also found widespread critical acclaim and further usage on US series Finding Carter and with make up brand Eyeko.

Marching to Another Beat, MALKA's debut album was released on Schlesinger's own record label Tantrum Records in June 2015. She played everything on the album and co-produced the record with Jay Glover. The singles have received plays on BBC Radio 6 Music, with support from Lauren Laverne who described the album as "brilliant", Steve Lamacq and Chris Hawkins. There has also been support from Huw Stephens on Radio 1, Amazing Radio and Late Junction on BBC Radio 3.

In April 2015, MALKA signed a sync deal with Peermusic. MALKA has played at Bestival headlining the bandstand stage, Secret Garden Party and has supported Sivu, Fujiya and Miyagi and Tim Minchin live and has had various syndications including:

"I Never Needed Love" which has been used in Girlfriends' Guide to Divorce

"Eyes on The Prize" which has appeared on Degrassi: Next Class

"Wonder Why" which was used in Catfish: The TV Show

"Wrap It Up" which was used on The Home Depot advert

MALKA's second album Ratatatat was released on 20 October 2017, which made various best of the year lists and gained further syncs.

Her most recent album I'm Not Your Soldier, which was released in February 2020, saw a host of critical acclaim across national press and radio play at BBC 6music playlist on BBC Scotland and Jessie Ware's pick on BBC Introducing on BBC Radio 1

In 2021 she was a lecturer in Music at the SAE Institute.

References

External links
 MALKA strives for better in the face of adversity on "Breakout"
 MALKA reveals video for 'Breakout' - premiere

Year of birth missing (living people)
Living people
British women singer-songwriters